PS- 129 (Karachi-XXXXI) is a Constituency reserved for a female in the Provincial Assembly of Sindh.

See also

 Sindh

References

External links 
 Official Website of Government of Sindh

Constituencies of Sindh